Dighton USD 482 is a public unified school district headquartered in Dighton, Kansas, United States.  The district includes the communities of Dighton, Alamota, Amy, Pendennis, Shields, and nearby rural areas.

Schools
The school district operates the following schools:
 Dighton High School (junior-senior high)
 Dighton Elementary School

It also maintains the PBL Academy program.

See also
 Kansas State Department of Education
 Kansas State High School Activities Association
 List of high schools in Kansas
 List of unified school districts in Kansas

References

External links
 

School districts in Kansas
Lane County, Kansas